The Gazimur (also Gasimur or Bolshoy Gazimur) is a river of Zabaykalsky Krai, Siberia, eastern Russia, a left tributary of the Argun. It originates in the north-west ridge of Nerchinsk. It flows generally from the south-west to north-east. The banks are typically steep, overgrown with bushes. The Gazimur typically has a shallow, rocky bottom, and clear water. It freezes at the beginning of November and thaws in early May. Gazimursky Zavod is located on the bank of the river.

In the early 1720s, the basin was explored for deposits of silver.

References

Rivers of Zabaykalsky Krai